The use of evidence under Bayes' theorem relates to the probability of finding evidence in relation to the accused, where Bayes' theorem concerns the probability of an event and its inverse. Specifically, it compares the probability of finding particular evidence if the accused were guilty, versus if they were not guilty. An example would be the probability of finding a person's hair at the scene, if guilty, versus if just passing through the scene. Another issue would be finding a person's DNA where they lived, regardless of committing a crime there.


Explanation
Among evidence scholars, the study of evidence in recent decades has become broadly interdisciplinary, incorporating insights from psychology, economics, and probability theory. One area of particular interest and controversy has been Bayes' theorem.
Bayes' theorem is an elementary proposition of probability theory.  It provides a way of updating, in light of new information, one’s probability that a proposition is true. Evidence scholars have been interested in  its application to their field,  either to study the value of rules of evidence, or to help determine facts at trial. 

Suppose, that the proposition to be proven is that defendant was the source of a hair found at the crime scene.  Before learning that the hair was a genetic match for the defendant’s hair, the factfinder believes that the odds are 2 to 1 that the defendant was the source of the hair.  If they used Bayes’ theorem, they could  multiply those prior odds by a “likelihood ratio” in order to update her odds after learning that the hair matched the defendant’s hair.   The likelihood ratio is a statistic derived by comparing the odds that the evidence (expert testimony of a match) would be found if the defendant was the source with the odds that it would be found if defendant was not the source.  If it is ten times more likely that the testimony of a match  would occur if the defendant was the source than if not, then the factfinder should multiply their prior odds by ten, giving posterior odds of 20 to one. 

Bayesian skeptics have objected to this use of Bayes’ theorem in litigation on a variety of grounds. These run from jury confusion and computational complexity to the assertion that standard probability theory is not a normatively satisfactory basis for adjudication of rights. 

Bayesian enthusiasts have replied on two fronts. First, they have said that whatever its value in litigation, Bayes' theorem is valuable in studying evidence rules.  For example, it can be used to model relevance.  It teaches that the relevance of evidence that a proposition is true depends on how much the evidence changes the prior odds, and that how much it changes the prior odds depends on how likely the evidence would be found (or not) if the proposition were true. These basic insights are also useful in studying individual evidence rules, such as the rule allowing witnesses to be impeached with prior convictions. 

Second, they have said that it is practical to use Bayes' theorem in a limited set of circumstances in litigation (such as integrating  genetic match evidence with other evidence), and that assertions that probability theory is inappropriate for judicial determinations are  nonsensical or inconsistent. 

Some observers believe that in recent years (i) the debate about probabilities has become stagnant, (ii) the protagonists in the probabilities debate have been  talking past each other, (iii) not much  is happening at the high-theory level, and (iv) the most interesting work is in the empirical study of the efficacy of instructions on Bayes’ theorem in improving jury accuracy. However, it is possible that this skepticism about the probabilities debate in law rests on observations of the arguments made by familiar protagonists in the legal academy. In fields outside of law, work on formal theories relating to uncertainty continues unabated. One important development has been the work on "soft computing" such as has been carried on, for example, at Berkeley under Lotfi Zadeh's BISC (Berkeley Initiative in Soft Computing). Another example is the increasing amount of work, by people both in and outside law, on "argumentation" theory. Also, work on Bayes nets continues. Some of this work is beginning to filter into legal circles. See, for example, the many papers on formal approaches to uncertainty (including Bayesian approaches) in the Oxford journal: Law, Probability and Risk .

Examples
There are some famous cases where Bayes' theorem can be applied.
 In the medical examples, a comparison is made between the evidence of cancer suggested by mammograms (5% show positive) versus the general risk of having cancer (1% in general): the ratio is 1:5, or 20% risk, of having breast cancer when a mammogram shows a positive result.
 A court case which argued the probabilities, with DNA evidence, is R v Adams.

See also
 R v Adams - court case about Bayes' Theorem with DNA

References

Evidence law
Bayesian statistics
Forensic statistics